Metro Inns is a British budget hotel company established in 2006 and is based in Newcastle. The chain has seven hotels in England, Scotland and Northern Ireland. 

In 2012 the company branched out to Northern Ireland with the purchase of the Lansdowne Hotel for £700,000. In early 2013 it acquired a number of hotels from Travelodge.

By May 2013 the company announced that several of its hotels were for sale after being placed in administration.

References

External links

Hotel chains in the United Kingdom
2006 establishments in the United Kingdom
Companies based in Newcastle upon Tyne